The 2021 MotoAmerica Superbike Championship season was the 45th season of the premier class of circuit-based motorcycle racing in the United States and the 7th since its renaming to MotoAmerica. Cameron Beaubier entered the season as the defending champion but did not defend his title after moving to the 2021 Moto2 World Championship.

Calendar and results

Teams and riders

Championship standings

Riders' championship

Scoring system
Points are awarded to the top fifteen finishers. A rider has to finish the race to earn points.

Superbike Cup

References

External links
 

MotoAmerica
MotoAmerica Superbike
MotoAmerica Superbike